Several cladistic analyses have shown that the genus Acacia is not monophyletic. While the subg. Acacia and subg. Phyllodinae are monophyletic, subg. Aculeiferum is not. This subgenus consists of three clades. Therefore, the following list of Acacia species cannot be maintained as a single entity, and must either be split up, or broadened to include species previously not in the genus.  This genus has been provisionally divided into 5 genera, Acacia, Vachellia, Senegalia, Acaciella and Mariosousa. The proposed type species of Acacia is Acacia penninervis.

Which of these segregate genera is to retain the name Acacia has been controversial.  The genus was previously typified with the African species Acacia scorpioides (L.) W.F.Wright, a synonym of Acacia nilotica (L.) Delile.  Under the original typification, the name Acacia would stay with the group of species currently recognized as the genus Vachellia.  Orchard and Maslin proposed a retypification of the genus Acacia with the species Acacia penninervis Sieber ex DC., an Australian species that is a member of the largest clade within Acacia, a primarily Australian group formerly recognized as Acacia subgenus Phyllodinae, on the basis that this results in the fewest nomenclatural changes.  Although this proposal met with strong disagreement by some authors, it was accepted on 16 July 2005 by the XVII International Botanical Congress in Vienna, Austria.  Consequently, the name Acacia is conserved for 948 Australian species, 7 in the Pacific Islands, 1 or 2 in Madagascar and 10 in tropical Asia.  Those outside Australia are split between the genera Acaciella, Mariosousa, Senegalia, and Vachellia. This decision was upheld at the 2011 Congress.

In its new circumscription, the genus Acacia (now limited to the Australian species) has seven subgenera—Alatae (an artificial section), Botrycephalae, Juliflorae, Lycopodiifoliae, Plurinerves, Phyllodinae, and Pulchellae (see below). The other species, distributed in the Indian Ocean, tropical Asia and tropical America are now classified under 
 Vachellia (former subgenus Acacia): 160+ species (pantropical)
 Senegalia (former subgenus Aculeiferum): 200+ species (pantropical)
 Parasenegalia: 7 species (pantropical)
 Pseudosenegalia: 2 species (Boliva)
 Acaciella (former subgenus Aculeiferum section Filicinae): 15 species (Americas)
 Mariosousa: 13 species related to (and including) Acacia coulteri (Americas)
Two Australian acacias were re-classified under Vachellia, and another two under Senegalia.

Species list 

This is a list of species that belong to Acacia sensu stricto. For species that have been transferred to other genera, see Acaciella, Mariosousa, Senegalia, and Vachellia.

Subgenus Alatae

 Acacia aemula
 subsp. aemula
 subsp. muricata
 Acacia alata—winged wattle
 var. alata
 var. biglandulosa
 var. genuina
 var. glabrata
 var. platyptera
 var. tetrantha
 Acacia anomala—Chittering grass wattle
 Acacia aphylla—leafless rock wattle
 Acacia applanata—grass wattle
 Acacia ataxiphylla
 subsp. ataxiphylla
 subsp. magna
 Acacia bifaria
 Acacia carens
 Acacia cerastes
 Acacia continua—thorn wattle
 Acacia cummingiana
 Acacia daviesioides
 Acacia glaucoptera—clay wattle, flat wattle
 Acacia incurva
 Acacia pterocaulon
 Acacia restiacea
 Acacia spinescens—spiny wattle, hard-leaf wattle
 Acacia stenoptera
 Acacia tetragonocarpa
 Acacia trigonophylla
 Acacia volubilis
 Acacia willdenowiana—grass wattle, two-winged acacia
 Acacia woodmaniorum

Subgenus Botrycephalae

 Acacia alaticaulis
 Acacia argentina
 Acacia baileyana—Cootamundra wattle, Bailey acacia
 Acacia blayana
 Acacia cangaiensis
 Acacia cardiophylla—West Wyalong wattle
 Acacia chinchillensis
 Acacia chrysotricha
 Acacia constablei
 Acacia dangarensis
 Acacia dealbata—silver wattle(Mupangara/Bangara)
 subsp. dealbata
 subsp. subalpina
 Acacia deanei—Deane's wattle
 subsp. deanei
 subsp. paucijuga
 Acacia debilis
 Acacia decurrens—Green wattle, Black wattle
 Acacia elata—Mountain Cedar wattle
 Acacia filicifolia—Fern-leaved wattle
 Acacia fulva—Velvet wattle
 Acacia glaucocarpa
 Acacia irrorata—Blueskin, Green wattle
 subsp. irrorata
 subsp. velutinella
 Acacia jonesii
 Acacia kulnurensis
 Acacia latisepala
 Acacia leptoclada
 Acacia leucoclada
 subsp. argentifolia
 subsp. leucoclada
 Acacia loroloba
 Acacia mearnsii—Black wattle
 Acacia mitchellii
 Acacia mollifolia
 Acacia muelleriana
 Acacia nanodealbata
 Acacia olsenii
 Acacia oshanesii—Silver Wattle
 Acacia parramattensis—South Wales Wattle, Sydney Green Wattle, Parramatta Wattle
 Acacia parvipinnula—Silver-stemmed Wattle
 Acacia pedleyi
 Acacia polybotrya—Western Silver Wattle
 Acacia pruinosa
 Acacia pubescens—Downy Wattle
 Acacia schinoides
 Acacia silvestris—Bodalla Silver Wattle
 Acacia spectabilis—Glory Wattle, Mudgee Wattle, Pilliga Wattle
 Acacia storyi
 Acacia terminalis—Cedar Wattle, Sunshine Wattle
 subsp. angustifolia
 subsp. aurea
 subsp. longiaxialis
 subsp. terminalis
 Acacia trachyphloia—Golden-feather Wattle, Bodalla Wattle

Subgenus Juliflorae (Benth.) Maiden & Betche

 Acacia abbatiana
 Acacia abbreviata
 Acacia aciphylla
 var. aciphylla
 var. leptostachys
 Acacia acradenia
 Acacia acuminata—Raspberry jam, fine leaf jam, ####### myal
 subsp. acuminata—Jam, Raspberry Jam
 subsp. burkittii—Burkitt's Wattle, Gunderbluey, Pin Bush, Sandhill Wattle, Fine Leaf Jam
 var. ciliata
 var. glaucescens
 var. latifolia
 Acacia adsurgens
 Acacia alpina—Alpine Wattle
 Acacia amentifera
 Acacia ammobia
 Acacia ampliata
 Acacia anastema—sandridge gidgee
 Acacia anastomosa Maslin, M.D.Barrett & R.L.Barrett
 Acacia ancistrocarpa
 Acacia aneura—Mulga
 Acacia aneura var. aneura
 Acacia aneura var. argentea
 Acacia aneura var. fuliginea
 Acacia aneura var. intermedia
 Acacia aneura var. macrocarpa
 Acacia aneura var. major
 Acacia aneura var. microcarpa
 Acacia aneura var. pilbarana
 Acacia aneura var. tenuis
 Acacia aprepta
 Acacia aprica
 Acacia aptaneura
 Acacia arcuatilis
 Acacia areolata
 Acacia argyraea
 Acacia arida
 Acacia armitii
 Acacia atkinsiana
 Acacia atopa
 Acacia aulacocarpa
 var. aulacocarpa
 var. brevifolia
 var. fruticosa
 var. macrocarpa
 Acacia auriculiformis—Earleaf Acacia, Northern Black Wattle, Ear-pod Wattle, Darwin Black Wattle, Papuan Wattle
 Acacia axillaris
 var. axillaris
 var. macrophylla
 Acacia ayersiana
 var. ayersiana
 var. latifolia
 Acacia barakulensis—Waajie Wattle
 Acacia beauverdiana
 Acacia binervia—Coast Myall
 Acacia blakei
 subsp. blakei
 subsp. diphylla
 Acacia brachystachya—Umbrella mulga, turpentine mulga, false bowgada
 Acacia brassii
 Acacia brockii
 Acacia bromilowiana
 Acacia bulgaensis
 Acacia burdekensis
 Acacia burkittii—Burkitt's Wattle, Gunderbluey, Pin Bush, Sandhill Wattle, Fine Leaf Jam
 Acacia burrowii—Burrow's Wattle
 Acacia burrowsiana
 Acacia caesaneura
 Acacia calligera
 Acacia calyculata
 Acacia camptocarpa Maslin, M.D.Barrett & R.L.Barrett
 Acacia caroleae
 Acacia cataractae
 Acacia catenulata—Bendee
 subsp. catenulata
 subsp. occidentalis
 Acacia celsa—Brown Salwood
 Acacia cheelii—Motherumbah
 Acacia chisholmii—Turpentine Bush, Chisholm's Wattle
 Acacia chrysochaeta
 Acacia cincinnata
 Acacia citrinoviridis—Black mulga, Wantan, Milhan, River Jam
 Acacia clelandii
 Acacia cochlocarpa
 subsp. cochlocarpa
 subsp. velutinosa
 Acacia cockertoniana
 Acacia colei—Cole's Wattle
 var. colei
 var. ileocarpa—Curly-podded Cole's Wattle
 Acacia concurrens
 Acacia conjunctifolia
 Acacia conniana
 Acacia conspersa
 Acacia coolgardiensis—Sugar brother
 subsp. coolgardiensis
 subsp. effusa
 subsp. latior
 Acacia courtii
 Acacia cowleana—Halls Creek Wattle
 Acacia cracentis
 Acacia craspedocarpa—Hop mulga
 Acacia crassa
 subsp. crassa
 subsp. longicoma
 Acacia crassicarpa—Thick-podded Salwood, Northern Wattle
 Acacia cretata
 Acacia curranii—Curly-bark Wattle
 Acacia cuthbertsonii
 subsp. cuthbertsonii
 subsp. linearis
 Acacia cyclocarpa Maslin, M.D.Barrett & R.L.Barrett
 Acacia cylindrica
 Acacia cyperophylla—Creekline Miniritchi, Red Mulga
 var. cyperophylla
 var. omearana—Omeara's Red Mulga
 Acacia dacrydioides
 Acacia dallachiana—Catkin Wattle
 Acacia delibrata
 Acacia demissa—Ashburton Willow, Moondyne Tree
 Acacia denticulosa—Sandpaper Wattle
 Acacia derwentiana
 Acacia desertorum
 var. desertorum
 var. nudipes
 Acacia desmondii
 Acacia diallaga
 Acacia diastemata Maslin, M.D.Barrett & R.L.Barrett
 Acacia difficilis
 Acacia dimidiata
 Acacia disparrima—Southern Salwood.
 subsp. calidestris—Dry-land Salwood
 subsp. disparrima
 Acacia dissimilis—Mitchell Plateau Wattle
 Acacia distans
 Acacia doratoxylon—Currawang
 Acacia drepanocarpa
 subsp. drepanocarpa
 subsp. latifolia
 Acacia drepanophylla
 Acacia echinuliflora
 Acacia effusa
 Acacia effusifolia
 Acacia elachantha
 Acacia epedunculata
 Acacia ephedroides
 Acacia eriopoda
 Acacia exilis
 Acacia faucium
 Acacia fauntleroyi
 Acacia fecunda
 Acacia filamentosa
 Acacia filifolia
 Acacia filipes
 Acacia floribunda—Gossamer Wattle
 Acacia fodinalis
 Acacia fuscaneura
 Acacia gardneri
 Acacia georgensis
 Acacia gibbosa
 Acacia gibsonii
 Acacia gloeotricha
 Acacia gonocarpa
 Acacia gonoclada
 Acacia gracilenta
 Acacia gracillima
 Acacia grandifolia
 Acacia granitica
 Acacia grasbyi—Minni Ritchie
 Acacia guymeri
 Acacia hamersleyensis
 Acacia hammondii
 Acacia helicophylla
 Acacia hemsleyi
 Acacia heteroneura
 var. heteroneura
 var. jutsonii
 var. petila
 var. prolixa
 Acacia hilliana—Hill's Tabletop Wattle
 Acacia holosericea—Soap Bush, Silver-leaved Wattle
 Acacia hopperiana
 Acacia humifusa
 Acacia hyaloneura
 Acacia incanicarpa
 Acacia incognita
 Acacia incongesta—Peak Charles Wattle
 Acacia incurvaneura
 Acacia inophloia—Fibre-barked Wattle
 Acacia intorta
 Acacia isoneura
 subsp. isoneura
 subsp. nimia
 Acacia jackesiana
 Acacia jamesiana
 Acacia jibberdingensis—Jibberding Wattle
 Acacia julifera
 subsp. curvinervia
 subsp. gilbertensis
 subsp. julifera
 Acacia karina
 Acacia kelleri
 Acacia kempeana—Wanderrie Wattle, Witchetty Bush
 Acacia kerryana
 Acacia kimberleyensis
 Acacia laccata
 Acacia lacertensis
 Acacia lamprocarpa—Western Salwood
 Acacia lasiocalyx
 Acacia latifolia
 Acacia latior
 Acacia lazaridis
 Acacia leeuweniana
 Acacia leiocalyx—Black Wattle, Curracabah, Early-flowering Black Wattle
 subsp. herveyensis
 subsp. leiocalyx
 Acacia lentiginea
 Acacia leptocarpa
 Acacia leptophleba
 Acacia leptostachya—Slender Wattle, Townsville Wattle
 Acacia lespedleyi P.I.Forst. 
 Acacia levata
 Acacia limbata
 Acacia linarioides
 Acacia lirellata
 subsp. compressa
 subsp. lirellata
 Acacia longifolia—Sydney Golden Wattle, Sallow Wattle, Boobialla, Native Willow
 subsp. longifolia
 subsp. sophorae—Coast Wattle
 Acacia longiphyllodinea—Yalgoo
 Acacia longispicata
 Acacia longissima
 Acacia lysiphloia—Turpentine
 Acacia macdonnelliensis—MacDonnell Mulga
 subsp. macdonnelliensis
 subsp. teretifolia
 Acacia macraneura
 Acacia maidenii—Maiden's Wattle
 Acacia malloclada
 Acacia mangium
 Acacia matthewii
 Acacia megalantha
 Acacia meiosperma
 Acacia merinthophora
 Acacia microneura
 Acacia midgleyi—Cape York Salwood
 Acacia minyura
 Acacia mountfordiae
 Acacia mucronata—Variable Sallow Wattle, Narrow-leaf Wattle
 subsp. dependens
 subsp. longifolia
 subsp. mucronata
 Acacia mulganeura
 Acacia multispicata
 Acacia multistipulosa
 Acacia nesophila
 Acacia neurocarpa
 Acacia neurophylla
 subsp. erugata
 subsp. neurophylla
 Acacia obtusifolia
 Acacia oldfieldii
 Acacia olgana—Mount Olga Wattle
 Acacia oligoneura
 Acacia oncinocarpa
 Acacia oncinophylla—Hook-leaved Acacia
 subsp. oncinophylla
 subsp. patulifolia
 Acacia orites
 Acacia orthocarpa
 Acacia oxycedrus—Spike Wattle
 Acacia pachycarpa
 Acacia palustris—Needlewood
 Acacia paraneura—Weeping Mulga
 Acacia paula
 Acacia pellita
 Acacia peregrinalis
 Acacia petraea—Lancewood
 Acacia phacelia Maslin, M.D.Barrett & R.L.Barrett
 Acacia phlebophylla—Buffalo Sallow Wattle
 Acacia plectocarpa
 subsp. plectocarpa
 subsp. tanumbirinensis
 Acacia polyadenia
 Acacia polystachya
 Acacia praetermissa
 Acacia proiantha
 Acacia pteraneura
 Acacia ptychophylla
 Acacia pubifolia
 Acacia pubirhachis
 Acacia pycnostachya
 Acacia quadrimarginea
 Acacia ramulosa—Bowgada, Horse Mulga
 var. linophylla
 var. ramulosa
 Acacia repanda
 Acacia resinimarginea—Old Man Wodjil
 Acacia retinervis
 Acacia rhigiophylla—Dagger-leaf Wattle
 Acacia rhodophloia—Minni ritchi
 Acacia rhodoxylon—Brown Spearwood, Rosewood, Ringy Rosewood
 Acacia riceana—Rice's Wattle
 Acacia richardsii
 Acacia rigescens
 Acacia rubricaulis
 Acacia scopulorum
 Acacia seclusa—Saw Ranges Wattle
 Acacia sericoflora
 Acacia sessilispica
 Acacia shirleyi—Lancewood
 Acacia sibina
 Acacia sibirica—Bastard Mulga
 Acacia signata
 Acacia singula
 Acacia solenota
 Acacia spania - Western Rosewood
 Acacia sparsiflora—Currawang, Currawong
 Acacia spirorbis
 subsp. solandri
 subsp. spirorbis
 Acacia stanleyi
 Acacia stereophylla
 var. cylindrata
 var. stereophylla
 Acacia stigmatophylla
 Acacia stipuligera
 Acacia striatifolia
 Acacia subcontorta
 Acacia subtessarogona
 Acacia subtilinervis
 Acacia sulcaticaulis
 Acacia symonii
 Acacia synantha Maslin, M.D.Barrett & R.L.Barrett
 Acacia synoria—Goodlands Wattle
 Acacia tarculensis—Granite Wattle, Granite Bush
 Acacia tenuinervis
 Acacia tenuispica
 Acacia tenuissima—Mulga
 Acacia tetraneura
 Acacia thoma
 Acacia thomsonii—Thomson's Wattle
 Acacia tingoorensis
 Acacia torulosa
 Acacia trachycarpa
 Acacia tratmaniana
 Acacia triptera—Spur-wing Wattle
 Acacia tropica
 Acacia tumida—Pindan Wattle, Sickle-leaf Wattle, Wangai, Spear Wattle
 var. extenta—Mt. Trafalgar Wattle
 var. kulparn
 var. pilbarensis
 var. tumida
 Acacia umbellata
 Acacia umbraculiformis
 Acacia undoolyana
 Acacia verticillata—Prickly Moses
 subsp. cephalantha
 subsp. ovoidea
 subsp. ruscifolia
 subsp. verticillata
 Acacia wanyu—Silver-leaf Mulga
 Acacia websteri
 Acacia wetarensis
 Acacia whitei
 Acacia wickhamii
 subsp. cassitera
 subsp. wickhamii
 Acacia williamsiana
 Acacia willingii
 Acacia xanthocarpa
 Acacia xiphophylla—Snake-wood
 Acacia yorkrakinensis
 subsp. acrita
 subsp. yorkrakinensis

Subgenus Lycopodiifoliae Pedley

 Acacia adoxa
 var. adoxa
 var. subglabra
 Acacia anasilla
 Acacia asperulacea
 Acacia baueri
 subsp. aspera
 subsp. baueri
 Acacia capillaris
 Acacia chippendalei—Chippendale's Wattle
 Acacia claviseta Maslin, M.D.Barrett & R.L.Barrett
 Acacia dimorpha Maslin, M.D.Barrett & R.L.Barrett
 Acacia equisetifolia Maslin & Cowie
 Acacia galioides
 Acacia hippuroides
 Acacia hypermeces
 Acacia longipedunculata
 Acacia lycopodiifolia
 Acacia mitodes
 Acacia orthotricha
 Acacia perryi
 Acacia porcata
 Acacia prolata Maslin, M.D.Barrett & R.L.Barrett
 Acacia repens
 Acacia smeringa
 Acacia spondylophylla—Curry Wattle
 Acacia zatrichota

Subgenus Phyllodineae

 Acacia acanthaster
 Acacia acanthoclada—Harrow Wattle
 subsp. acanthoclada
 subsp. glaucescens
 Acacia acinacea—Round-leaved Wattle, Gold-dust Wattle
 var. acinacea
 var. brevipedunculata
 Acacia acoma
 Acacia acrionastes
 Acacia acuaria
 Acacia aculeatissima—Thin-leaf Wattle, Snake Wattle
 Acacia aculeiformis
 Acacia acutata
 Acacia adinophylla
 Acacia adunca—Wallangarra Wattle, Cascade Wattle
 Acacia aestivalis
 Acacia alcockii
 Acacia alexandri
 Acacia alleniana
 Acacia amblygona—Fan Wattle
 Acacia amblyophylla
 Acacia amoena—Boomerang Wattle
 Acacia ampliceps—Salt Wattle
 Acacia anceps
 Acacia andrewsii
 Acacia angusta
 Acacia anthochaera
 Acacia aphanoclada—Nullagine Ghost Wattle
 Acacia araneosa—Spidery Wattle, Balcanoona Wattle
 Acacia arbiana
 Acacia argutifolia—Easty Barrens wattle
 Acacia argyrophylla—Silver Mulga
 Acacia aristulata
 Acacia asepala
 Acacia ashbyae
 Acacia asparagoides
 Acacia aspera—Rough Wattle
 subsp. aspera
 subsp. parviceps
 Acacia atrox
 subsp. atrox
 subsp. planiticola
 Acacia attenuata
 Acacia aureocrinita
 Acacia auronitens
 var. auronitens
 var. mollis
 Acacia ausfeldii—Ausfeld's Wattle, Whipstick Cinnamon Wattle
 Acacia bancroftiorum
 Acacia barbinervis
 subsp. barbinervis
 subsp. borealis
 Acacia barringtonensis—Barrington Wattle
 Acacia basedowii—Basedow's Wattle
 Acacia baxteri—Baxter's Wattle
 Acacia beadleana
 Acacia beckleri—Barrier Range Wattle
 subsp. beckleri
 subsp. megaspherica
 Acacia betchei—Red-tip Wattle
 Acacia bidentata
 var. australis
 var. bidentata
 var. pubescens
 Acacia biflora—Two-flowered Acacia
 Acacia binata
 Acacia binervata—Two-veined Hickory
 Acacia bivenosa—Two-nerved Wattle
 Acacia blakelyi
 Acacia blaxellii—Blaxell's Wattle
 Acacia boormanii—Snowy River Wattle
 Acacia botrydion
 Acacia brachybotrya—Bluebush, Grey Wattle, Grey Mulga
 Acacia brachycarpa
 Acacia brachyclada
 Acacia bracteolata
 Acacia brownii—Heath Wattle, Prickly Moses
 Acacia brumalis
 Acacia brunioides
 subsp. brunioides
 subsp. granitica
 Acacia burbidgeae—Burbidge's Wattle
 Acacia buxifolia—Box-leaf Wattle
 subsp. buxifolia
 subsp. pubiflora
 Acacia caerulescens—Buchan Blue
 Acacia caesiella—Tableland Wattle, Bluebush Wattle, Blue bush
 Acacia calamifolia—Broom Wattle, Wallowa, Reed-leaf Wattle
 Acacia calantha
 Acacia calcarata
 Acacia camptoclada
 Acacia carneorum—Needle Wattle, Dead Finish, Purple-wood Wattle
 Acacia carnosula
 Acacia castanostegia
 Acacia cedroides
 Acacia celastrifolia—Glowing Wattle, Celastrus-leaved Acacia
 Acacia centrinervia—White Hairy Wattle
 Acacia chalkeri—Chalker's Wattle
 Acacia chamaeleon
 Acacia chartacea
 Acacia chrysella
 Acacia chrysocephala
 Acacia clandullensis
 Acacia clunies-rossiae—Kowmung Wattle
 Acacia clydonophora
 Acacia concolorans
 Acacia conferta—Crowded-leaf Wattle
 Acacia confluens
 Acacia congesta
 subsp. cliftoniana
 subsp. congesta
 subsp. wonganensis
 Acacia costata
 Acacia costiniana
 Acacia covenyi—Blue Bush
 Acacia crassistipula
 Acacia crassiuscula
 Acacia crassuloides
 Acacia cremiflora
 Acacia cretacea
 Acacia crispula
 Acacia crombiei—Pink Gidgee
 Acacia cultriformis—Knife-leaf Wattle, Dogtooth Wattle, Half-moon Wattle, Golden-glow Wattle
 Acacia cuneifolia
 Acacia cupularis—Coastal Umbrella Bush
 Acacia cuspidifolia—Wait-a-while, Bohemia
 Acacia daphnifolia
 Acacia daviesii
 Acacia decora—Showy Wattle, Western Golden Wattle, Western Silver Wattle
 Acacia deficiens
 Acacia delphina—Dolphin Wattle
 Acacia dempsteri
 Acacia dentifera—Tooth-bearing Acacia
 Acacia dermatophylla
 Acacia deuteroneura
 Acacia diaphana
 Acacia diaphyllodinea
 Acacia dictyocarpa
 Acacia dictyophleba
 Acacia didyma
 Acacia dietrichiana
 Acacia difformis—Drooping Wattle, Wyalong Wattle, Mystery Wattle
 Acacia dilatata
 Acacia diminuta
 Acacia disticha—Mamoose Tree
 Acacia divergens
 Acacia dodonaeifolia—Sticky Wattle, Hop-leaved Wattle
 Acacia dorothea—Dorothy's Wattle
 Acacia dorsenna
 Acacia durabilis
 Acacia echinula—Hedgehog Wattle
 Acacia ensifolia
 Acacia eremophiloides
 Acacia ericifolia
 Acacia ericksoniae
 Acacia erinacea
 Acacia erioclada
 Acacia errabunda
 Acacia euthycarpa
 subsp. euthycarpa
 subsp. oblanceolata
 Acacia euthyphylla
 Acacia evenulosa
 Acacia everistii
 Acacia excentrica
 Acacia exocarpoides
 Acacia extensa—Wiry Wattle
 Acacia exudans—Casterton Wattle
 Acacia falcata—Burra, Sally, Sickle-shaped Acacia, Silver-leaved Wattle
 Acacia falciformis—Mountain hickory, Broad-leaved hickory, black Wattle, large-leaf hickory Wattle
 Acacia fasciculifera—Scrub Ironbark
 Acacia ferocior
 Acacia fimbriata—Fringed Wattle, Brisbane Golden Wattle
 Acacia flabellifolia
 Acacia flagelliformis
 Acacia flexifolia—Bent-leaf Wattle, Small Winter Wattle
 Acacia flocktoniae
 Acacia floydii
 Acacia forrestiana
 Acacia forsythii—Warrumbungle Range Wattle
 Acacia gelasina
 Acacia genistifolia—Spreading Wattle, Early Wattle
 Acacia gillii—Gill's Wattle
 Acacia gittinsii
 Acacia gladiiformis—Sword Wattle, Sword-leaf Wattle
 Acacia glandulicarpa—Hairy-pod Wattle
 Acacia glaucissima
 Acacia glaucocaesia
 Acacia glutinosissima
 Acacia gnidium
 Acacia gonophylla
 Acacia gordonii
 Acacia graniticola
 Acacia gregorii—Gregory's Wattle
 Acacia gunnii—Ploughshare Wattle, Dog's Tooth Wattle
 Acacia hakeoides—Hakea-leaved Wattle, Western Black Wattle, Hakea Wattle
 Acacia halliana
 Acacia hamiltoniana—Hamilton's Wattle
 Acacia handonis—Hando's Wattle, Percy Grant Wattle
 Acacia harveyi
 Acacia hastulata
 Acacia hemiteles—Broombush, Tan Wattle
 Acacia hendersonii
 Acacia heterochroa—Bob's Wattle
 subsp. heterochroa
 subsp. robertii
 Acacia hispidula—Little Harsh Acacia, Rough-leaved Acacia, Rough Hairy Wattle
 Acacia hockingsii
 Acacia holotricha
 Acacia horridula
 Acacia howittii—Howitt's Wattle, Sticky Wattle
 Acacia hubbardiana—Yellow Prickly Moses
 Acacia huegelii
 Acacia hystrix
 subsp. continua
 subsp. hystrix
 Acacia idiomorpha
 Acacia imbricata—Imbricate Wattle
 Acacia imitans
 Acacia imparilis
 Acacia improcera
 Acacia inaequilatera—Camel Bush, Corky Canji
 Acacia inaequiloba
 Acacia inamabilis
 Acacia incrassata
 Acacia infecunda
 Acacia ingramii
 Acacia ingrata
 Acacia inops
 Acacia insolita
 subsp. efoliolata
 subsp. insolita
 subsp. recurva
 Acacia intricata
 Acacia islana
 Acacia iteaphylla—Winter Wattle, Flinders Range Wattle, Willow-leaved Wattle
 Acacia ixodes—Motherumbung
 Acacia jacksonioides
 Acacia jasperensis
 Acacia jennerae—Coonavittra Wattle
 Acacia jensenii
 Acacia johnsonii—Gereera Wattle
 Acacia jucunda
 Acacia juncifolia—Rush-leaf Wattle
 Acacia kettlewelliae—Buffalo Wattle
 Acacia kochii
 Acacia kybeanensis—Kybean Wattle
 Acacia kydrensis—Kydra Wattle
 Acacia lachnophylla
 Acacia lanceolata
 Acacia laricina
 var. crassifolia
 var. laricina
 Acacia lauta
 Acacia leichhardtii—Leichhardt's Wattle
 Acacia leiophylla
 Acacia leprosa—Cinnamon Wattle
 var. crassipoda
 var. graveolens
 var. leprosa
 var. magna
 var. uninervia
 Acacia leptalea—Chinocup Wattle
 Acacia leptopetala
 Acacia leptospermoides
 subsp. leptospermoides
 subsp. obovata
 subsp. psammophila
 Acacia leucolobia
 Acacia ligulata—Dune Wattle, Sandhill Wattle, Small Cooba, Umbrella Bush Wirra
 Acacia ligustrina
 Acacia linearifolia—Stringybark Wattle, Narrow-leaved Wattle
 Acacia lineata—Streaked Wattle, Narrow-lined Leaved Acacia
 Acacia linifolia—White Wattle, Flax-leaved Wattle
 Acacia littorea
 Acacia lucasii—Wooly-bear Wattle, Lucas's Wattle
 Acacia lullfitziorum
 Acacia lunata
 Acacia mabellae—Mabel's Wattle, Black Wattle
 Acacia macnuttiana—McNutt's Wattle
 Acacia macradenia—Zig-zag Wattle
 Acacia maitlandii—Maitland's Wattle, Spiky Wattle
 Acacia mariae
 Acacia marramamba
 Acacia maxwellii
 Acacia meiantha
 Acacia meisneri
 Acacia melleodora
 Acacia merrallii
 Acacia merrickiae
 Acacia microbotrya—Manna Wattle
 var. borealis—Northern Manna Wattle
 var. microbotrya
 Acacia microcalyx
 Acacia microcarpa—Manna Wattle
 Acacia minutissima
 Acacia montana
 Acacia mooreana
 Acacia muriculata
 Acacia murrayana—Murray's Wattle, Powder Bark Wattle, Colony Wattle, Sandplain Wattle
 Acacia mutabilis
 subsp. angustifolia
 subsp. incurva
 subsp. mutabilis
 subsp. rhynchophylla
 subsp. stipulifera
 Acacia myrtifolia—Myrtle Wattle, Red Stem Wattle, South Australian Silver Wattle
 Acacia nana
 Acacia nanopravissima
 Acacia nematophylla
 Acacia neriifolia—Oleander-leaved Wattle, ####### Yarran, Black Wattle
 Acacia nervosa—Rib Wattle
 Acacia nigripilosa
 subsp. latifolia
 subsp. nigripilosa
 Acacia nodiflora
 Acacia notabilis—Notable Wattle, Flinder's Wattle, Stiff Golden Wattle
 Acacia nova-anglica—New England Hickory
 Acacia obliquinervia—Mount Hickory Wattle
 Acacia obovata
 Acacia obtusata—Blunt-leaf Wattle, Obtuse Wattle
 Acacia orbifolia
 Acacia oxyclada
 Acacia pachyacra
 Acacia pachyphylla
 Acacia pachypoda
 Acacia paradoxa—Paradox Acacia, Kangaroo Thorn, Hedge Wattle, Prickly Wattle
 Acacia pataczekii—Wally's Wattle, Pataczek's Wattle
 Acacia pedina
 Acacia penninervis—Mountain Hickory, Hickory Wattle
 var. longiracemosa
 var. penninervis
 Acacia perangusta—Eprapah Wattle
 Acacia peuce—Waddy-wood, Waddy, Waddi, Birdsville Wattle
 Acacia phaeocalyx
 Acacia phasmoides—Phantom Wattle
 Acacia phlebopetala
 var. phlebopetala
 var. pubescens
 Acacia pickardii
 Acacia piligera
 Acacia pilligaensis—Pinbush Wattle, Pilliga Wattle
 Acacia plautella

 Acacia podalyriifolia—Pearl Wattle, Queensland Silver Wattle, Mt. Morgan Wattle
 Acacia polifolia
 Acacia poliochroa
 Acacia praemorsa
 Acacia prainii—Prain's Wattle
 Acacia pravifolia—Coiled-pod Wattle
 Acacia pravissima—Oven's Wattle, Wedge-leaf Wattle, Tumut Wattle
 Acacia pritzeliana
 Acacia profusa
 Acacia prominens—Gosford Wattle, Golden Rain Wattle, Grey Sally
 Acacia provincialis
 Acacia pruinocarpa—Black Gidgee, Gidgee, Twau
 Acacia pubicosta
 Acacia pulviniformis
 Acacia puncticulata
 Acacia purpureopetala
 Acacia pusilla
 Acacia pustula
 Acacia pycnantha—Australian Golden Wattle, Broad-leaved Wattle
 Acacia pycnocephala
 Acacia pygmaea
 Acacia pyrifolia—Kanji Bush
 var. morrisonii
 var. pyrifolia
 Acacia quadrilateralis
 Acacia quadrisulcata
 Acacia quinquenervia
 Acacia quornensis—Quorn Wattle
 Acacia rendlei
 Acacia resinicostata
 Acacia retinodes—Retinodes Water Wattle, Swamp Wattle, Wirilda, Ever-blooming Wattle, Silver Wattle
 var. retinodes
 var. uncifolia
 Acacia retrorsa
 Acacia rhamphophylla
 Acacia rhetinocarpa
 Acacia rigida
 Acacia rivalis—Creek Wattle, Silver Wattle
 Acacia robeorum
 Acacia robiniae—Robin's Wattle
 Acacia rossei
 Acacia rostellata
 Acacia rostellifera—Summer-scented Wattle
 Acacia rostriformis—Bacchus Marsh Wattle
 Acacia rubida—Red-stem Wattle, Red-leaf Wattle
 Acacia rubricola
 Acacia rupicola
 Acacia ruppii—Rupp's Wattle
 Acacia ryaniana
 Acacia sabulosa
 Acacia saliciformis
 Acacia salicina—Willow Acacia, Broughton Willow, Cooba, Willow Wattle, Native Wattle, Doolan
 Acacia saligna—Orange Wattle, Golden Wreath Wattle, Blue-leafed Wattle, Western Australian Golden Wattle, Port Jackson, Willow Wattle
 Acacia saxatilis
 Acacia saxicola
 Acacia scabra
 Acacia scalena
 Acacia scalpelliformis
 Acacia scirpifolia
 Acacia scleroclada
 Acacia sclerosperma
 subsp. glaucescens—Billy Blue
 subsp. sclerosperma
 Acacia sedifolia
 subsp. pulvinata
 subsp. sedifolia
 Acacia semiaurea
 Acacia semibinervia
 Acacia semicircinalis
 Acacia semilunata
 Acacia semirigida
 Acacia semitrullata
 Acacia sericocarpa
 Acacia serpentinicola
 Acacia sertiformis
 Acacia sessilis
 Acacia shuttleworthii
 Acacia siculiformis—Dagger Wattle
 Acacia simmonsiana—Simmon's Wattle
 Acacia simulans—Barrens Kindred Wattle
 Acacia sorophylla
 Acacia spathulifolia
 Acacia sphacelata
 subsp. recurva
 subsp. sphacelata
 subsp. verticillata
 Acacia sphenophylla
 Acacia spilleriana
 Acacia spinosissima
 Acacia splendens
 Acacia spooneri
 Acacia sporadica
 Acacia squamata
 Acacia startii
 Acacia steedmanii
 subsp. borealis
 subsp. steedmanii
 Acacia stictophylla
 Acacia stricta—Hop Wattle
 Acacia strongylophylla—Round-leaf Wattle
 Acacia suaveolens—Sweet Wattle, Sweet-scented Wattle
 Acacia subcaerulea—Blue-barked Acacia
 Acacia subrigida
 Acacia subtiliformis
 Acacia subulata—Awl-leaf Wattle
 Acacia synchronicia
 Acacia tabula
 Acacia telmica
 Acacia teretifolia
 Acacia tetragonophylla—Dead Finish, Kurara, Curara
 Acacia tetraptera
 Acacia tindaleae—Golden-top Wattle, Crowned Wattle
 Acacia toondulya
 Acacia torringtonensis
 Acacia triquetra
 Acacia truculenta
 Acacia trudgeniana
 Acacia truncata
 Acacia tuberculata
 Acacia tysonii—Tyson's Wattle
 Acacia ulicifolia—Prickly Moses, Juniper Wattle
 Acacia ulicina
 Acacia uliginosa
 Acacia uncifera
 Acacia uncifolia—Coast Wirilda
 Acacia uncinata
 Acacia undulifolia
 Acacia unifissilis
 Acacia urophylla—Pointed-leaved Acacia, Tail-leaved Acacia
 Acacia validinervia—Alumaru, Nyalanyalara
 Acacia vassalii
 Acacia verniciflua—Varnish Wattle
 Acacia vestita—Hairy Wattle, Weeping Boree
 Acacia victoriae—Acacia Bush, Bohemia, Bramble Wattle, Elegant Wattle, Narran, Gundabluey, Prickly Wattle
 subsp. arida
 subsp. fasciaria
 subsp. victoriae
 Acacia walkeri
 Acacia wardellii
 Acacia wattsiana—Watt's Wattle, Dog Wattle
 Acacia wilcoxii
 Acacia williamsonii—Whirrakee Wattle
 Acacia wiseana
 Acacia xanthina—White-stemmed Wattle
 Acacia xerophila
 var. brevior
 var. xerophila

Subgenus Plurinerves (Benth.) Maiden & Betche

 Acacia abrupta
 Acacia acellerata
 Acacia adenogonia
 Acacia adnata
 Acacia amanda
 Acacia ammophila
 Acacia amyctica
 Acacia anaticeps
 Acacia ancistrophylla—Dwarf Myall
 var. ancistrophylla
 var. lissophylla
 var. perarcuata
 Acacia anfractuosa
 Acacia anserina Maslin, M.D.Barrett & R.L.Barrett
 Acacia arafurica
 Acacia argyrodendron—Black Gidyea, Blackwood
 Acacia argyrotricha
 Acacia armillata
 Acacia arrecta
 Acacia ascendens
 Acacia assimilis
 var. assimilis
 var. atroviridis
 Acacia aulacophylla
 Acacia auratiflora
 Acacia auricoma—Alumaru, Nyalpilintji Wattle
 Acacia auripila—Rudall River Myall
 Acacia awestoniana
 Acacia baeuerlenii
 Acacia bakeri—Baker's Wattle
 Acacia balsamea—Balsam Wattle
 Acacia barattensis—Baratta Wattle
 Acacia barrettiorum
 Acacia bartlei
 Acacia benthamii
 Acacia brachyphylla
 var. brachyphylla
 var. recurvata
 Acacia brachypoda—Chinocup Wattle
 Acacia burrana
 Acacia bynoeana—Bynoe's Wattle, Tiny Wattle
 Acacia caesariata
 Acacia calcicola—Northern Myall, Grey Myall, Shrubby Mulga, Shrubby Wattle
 Acacia cambagei—Gidgee, Gidyea, Stinking Wattle
 Acacia campylophylla
 Acacia cana—Boree, Broad-leaved Nealie, Cabbage-tree Wattle
 Acacia cassicula
 Acacia cavealis
 Acacia chapmanii
 subsp. australis
 subsp. chapmanii
 Acacia chrysopoda
 Acacia cochlearis—Rigid Wattle
 Acacia cognata—Bower Wattle, Narrow-leaf Bower Wattle
 Acacia colletioides—Pin-bush, Spine Bush, Wait-a-while
 Acacia comans
 Acacia complanata
 Acacia confusa—Small Philippine Acacia, Formosa Acacia, Formosan Koa
 var. confusa
 var. inamurai
 Acacia consanguinea
 Acacia consobrina
 Acacia convallium
 Acacia coriacea—Desert Oak, Wirewood, Dogwood, Wiry Wattle
 Acacia coriacea ** subsp. 'coriacea Acacia coriacea ** subsp. ''''pendens
 Acacia coriacea ** subsp. 'sericophylla Acacia cowaniana—Cowan's Wattle
 Acacia crenulata Acacia curvata Acacia cyclops—Cyclops Acacia, Western Coastal Wattle, red-eyed wattle, rooikrans
 Acacia dawsonii—Poverty Wattle, Mitta Wattle, Dawson's Wattle
 Acacia declinata Acacia deflexa Acacia delicatula Acacia deltoidea subsp. ampla subsp. deltoidea Acacia densiflora Acacia dictyoneura Acacia dielsii Acacia dissona var. dissona var. indoloria Acacia dolichophylla Acacia donaldsonii—Binneringie Wattle
 Acacia dunnii—Dunn's Wattle, Elephant-ear Wattle
 Acacia dura Acacia duriuscula Acacia elongata—Swamp Wattle, Slender Wattle
 Acacia enervia subsp. enervia subsp. explicata Acacia enterocarpa—Jumping Jack Wattle
 Acacia eremaea Acacia eremophila var. eremophila var. variabilis Acacia estrophiolata—Southern Ironwood
 Acacia excelsa—Belah, Belar, Ironwood, Rosewood, Bunkerman
 subsp. angusta subsp. excelsa Acacia farinosa—Mealy Wattle
 Acacia flavescens—Yellow Wattle, Red Wattle
 Acacia flavipila var. flavipula var. ovalis Acacia fleckeri Acacia formidabilis Acacia fragilis Acacia frigescens—Montane Wattle, Forest Wattle, Frosted Wattle
 Acacia froggattii Acacia galeata Acacia gemina Acacia georginae—Georgina Gidgee, Poison Gidyea
 Acacia gilesiana—Giles' Wattle
 Acacia gracilifolia—Graceful Wattle
 Acacia graciliformis Acacia hadrophylla Acacia harpophylla—Brigalow, Brigalow Spearwood, Orkor
 Acacia havilandiorum—Needle Wattle, Haviland's Wattle
 Acacia helmsiana Acacia hemignosta—Club-leaf Wattle
 Acacia heteroclita subsp. heteroclita subsp. valida Acacia heterophylla Acacia hexaneura Acacia homaloclada Acacia homalophylla—Yarran
 Acacia hylonoma Acacia implexa—Lightwood, Hickory Wattle, Screw-pod Wattle, ####### Myall, Fish Wattle, Broad-leaf Wattle
 Acacia inceana subsp. conformis subsp. inceana subsp. latifolia Acacia ixiophylla Acacia johannis Acacia kalgoorliensis—Kalgoorlie Wattle
 Acacia kauaiensis Acacia kenneallyi Acacia kingiana Acacia koa—Koa
 Acacia koaia—Koaia, Koaoha
 Acacia lanei—Hyden Wattle
 Acacia lanigera—Woolly Wattle, Hairy Wattle
 var. gracilipes
 var. lanigera
 var. whanii
 Acacia lanuginophylla—Woolly Wattle
 Acacia latescens—Ball Wattle
 Acacia latipes
 subsp. latipes
 subsp. licina
 Acacia latzii—Latz's Wattle
 Acacia legnota
 Acacia leptoloba
 Acacia leptoneura
 Acacia lineolata—Dwarf Myall
 subsp. lineolata
 subsp. multilineata
 Acacia lobulata—Chiddarcooping Wattle
 Acacia loderi—Nealie, Broken Hill Gidgee, Myall
 Acacia longispinea
 Acacia loxophylla
 Acacia lumholtzii
 Acacia mackeyana
 Acacia maconochieana—Mullan Wattle
 Acacia manipularis
 Acacia maranoensis—Womel
 Acacia masliniana—Maslin's Wattle
 Acacia mathuataensis
 Acacia melanoxylon—Australian Blackwood, Sally Wattle, Lightwood, Hickory, Mudgerabah
 Acacia melvillei—Yarran
 Acacia menzelii—Menzel's Wattle
 Acacia microcybe
 Acacia microsperma—Bowyakka
 Acacia mimica
 var. angusta
 var. mimica
 Acacia mimula
 Acacia minutifolia
 Acacia monticola
 Acacia multisiliqua
 Acacia newmanii
 Acacia nitidula
 Acacia nivea
 Acacia nuperrima
 Acacia nyssophylla
 Acacia obesa
 Acacia obtecta
 Acacia obtriangularis Maslin, M.D.Barrett & R.L.Barrett
 Acacia octonervia
 Acacia ommatosperma
 Acacia ophiolithica
 Acacia oraria—ai soeli
 Acacia orthotropica Maslin, M.D.Barrett & R.L.Barrett
 Acacia oswaldii—Umbrella Wattle, Umbrella Bush, Miljee, Nelia, Whyacka, Middia, Curly Yarran
 Acacia papulosa
 Acacia papyrocarpa—Western Myall
 Acacia patagiata
 Acacia pelophila
 Acacia pendula—Weeping Myall, Myall, Boree, Balaar, Nilyah, Silver-leaf Boree, True Myall
 Acacia perpusilla Maslin, M.D.Barrett & R.L.Barrett—King Edward River wattle
 Acacia pharangites—Wongan Gully Wattle
 Acacia phlebocarpa—Table-top Wattle
 Acacia pinguiculosa
 subsp. pinguiculosa
 subsp. teretifolia
 Acacia pinguifolia—Fat-leaved Wattle
 Acacia platycarpa—Ghost Wattle, Pindan Wattle
 Acacia praelongata
 Acacia prismifolia
 Acacia producta
 Acacia ptychoclada
 Acacia racospermoides
 Acacia ramiflora
 Acacia recurvata
 Acacia redolens—Bank Catclaw
 Acacia resinistipulea
 Acacia resinosa
 Acacia retivenea
 subsp. clandestina
 subsp. retivenea
 Acacia richii
 Acacia ridleyana
 Acacia rigens—Beedle Wattle, Nealie, Needle-bush Wattle, Nealia, Nilyah
 Acacia rothii
 Acacia roycei
 Acacia sciophanes—Ghost Wattle
 Acacia sclerophylla—Hard-leaf Wattle
 var. pilosa
 var. sclerophylla
 var. teretiuscula
 Acacia sericata Acacia sericophylla—Cork-bark Wattle, Desert dogwood
 Acacia setulifera Acacia sibilans—Whispering Myall
 Acacia simsii—Sim's Wattle, Heathlands Wattle
 Acacia speckii Acacia spectra Acacia spongolitica Acacia stellaticeps—Northern star wattle, Glistening wattle
 Acacia stenophylla—Belalei, Munumula, Balkura, Gurley, Gooralee, Ironwood, Dalby Wattle, River Cooba, River Myall, Eumong, Native willow, Black Wattle, Dunthy
 Acacia stipulosa Acacia subflexuosa subsp. capillata
 subsp. subflexuosa
 Acacia sublanata Acacia subporosa—Bower Wattle, River Wattle, Narrow-leaf Bower Wattle, Sticky Bower Wattle
 Acacia subsessilis 
 Acacia subternata Acacia sulcata var. planoconvexa
 var. platyphylla
 var. sulcata
 Acacia tenuior
 Acacia tephrina—Boree
 Acacia tessellata
 Acacia tetanophylla
 Acacia tolmerensis
 Acacia torticarpa
 Acacia translucens—Poverty bush
 Acacia trinalis
 Acacia trinervata—Three-nerved Wattle
 Acacia trineura—Three-nerved Wattle, Three-veined Wattle, Hindmarsh Wattle, Green Wattle
 Acacia triptycha
 Acacia trulliformis
 Acacia uncinella
 Acacia undosa
 Acacia unguicula
 Acacia venulosa
 Acacia veronica
 Acacia verricula
 Acacia vincentii
 Acacia viscidula—Sticky Wattle
 Acacia viscifolia
 Acacia vittata—Lake Logue Wattle
 Acacia warramaba
 Acacia webbii
 Acacia whibleyana
 Acacia wilhelmiana—Dwarf Nealie, Wilhelmi's Wattle, Mist Wattle
 Acacia wilsonii
 Acacia yirrkallensis

Subgenus Pulchellae

 Acacia amputata
 Acacia anarthros
 Acacia browniana—Brown's Wattle
 var. browniana
 var. endlicheri
 var. glaucescens
 var. intermedia
 var. obscura
 Acacia depressa—Echidna Wattle
 Acacia drewiana
 subsp. drewiana
 subsp. minor
 Acacia drummondii—Drummond's Wattle
 subsp. affinis
 subsp. candolleana
 subsp. drummondii
 subsp. elegans
 Acacia empelioclada
 Acacia epacantha
 Acacia fagonioides
 Acacia gilbertii
 Acacia grisea
 Acacia guinetii—Guinet's Wattle
 Acacia lasiocarpa
 var. bracteolata
 var. lasiocarpa
 var. sedifolia
 Acacia lateriticola
 Acacia leioderma
 Acacia luteola
 Acacia megacephala
 Acacia moirii—Moir's Wattle
 subsp. dasycarpa
 subsp. moirii
 subsp. recurvistipula
 Acacia newbeyi
 Acacia nigricans
 Acacia pentadenia—Karri Wattle, Catbush
 subsp. pentadenia
 subsp. syntoma
 Acacia plicata
 Acacia preissiana
 Acacia pulchella —Prickly moses
 var. glaberrima
 var. goadbyi
 var. pulchella
 var. reflexa
 Acacia subracemosa—Western Karn Wattle
 Acacia tayloriana
 Acacia varia
 var. crassinervis
 var. parviflora
 var. varia

Incertae Sedis

 Acacia simplex
 Acacia test

Hybrids

 Acacia adoxa var. adoxa × spondylophylla
 Acacia adsurgens × rhodophloia
 Acacia ampliceps × bivenosa
 Acacia ampliceps × sclerosperma subsp. sclerosperma
 Acacia ancistrocarpa × arida
 Acacia ancistrocarpa × citrinoviridis
 Acacia ancistrocarpa × hilliana
 Acacia ancistrocarpa × orthocarpa
 Acacia aphanoclada × pyrifolia var. pyrifolia
 Acacia arida × stellaticeps
 Acacia auriculiformis × mangium (either direction)
 Acacia ayersiana × incurvaneura
 Acacia baileyana × dealbata
 Acacia bivenosa × sclerosperma subsp. sclerosperma
 Acacia caesaneura × incurvaneura
 Acacia citrinoviridis × tumida var. pilbarensis
 Acacia craspedocarpa × macraneura
 Acacia craspedocarpa × ramulosa
 Acacia ×daweana Maslin (=? A. effusa × hamersleyensis)
 Acacia decurrens × mearnsii
 Acacia dodonaeifolia × paradoxa
 Acacia eriopoda × monticola
 Acacia eriopoda × trachycarpa
 Acacia eriopoda × tumida var. pilbarensis
 Acacia eriopoda × tumida var. tumida
 Acacia glaucocaesia × synchronicia
 Acacia ×grayana J.H.Willis (= A. brachybotrya × euthycarpa)
 Acacia hilliana × stellaticeps
 Acacia incurvaneura × mulganeura
 Acacia ligulata × sclerosperma subsp. sclerosperma
 Acacia longifolia × oxycedrus
 Acacia monticola × trachycarpa
 Acacia monticola × tumida var. kulparn
 Acacia monticola × tumida var. pilbarensis
 Acacia mucronata × acutata
 Acacia ×nabbonandii Nash (= Acacia baileyana × decurrens)
 Acacia oxycedrus × sophorae
 Acacia rhodophloia × sibirica
 Acacia ×sphaerostachya E.Pritzel (=? Acacia stellaticeps × ancistocarpa)
 Acacia stellaticeps × trachycarpa
 Acacia trachycarpa × tumida var. pilbarensis

References 

 Global Biodiversity Information Facility
 New proposals for Acacia
 A synopsis of the classification and phylogeny of Acacia
 Brummitt, R.K. (2004). Report of the Committee for Spermatophyta: 55. Proposal 1584 on Acacia Taxon, Volume 53, Number 3, 1 August 2004, pp. 826–829
 List of Acacia Species in the U.S.
 Seigler et al., Mariosousa, a New Segregate Genus from Acacia s.l. (Fabaceae, Mimosoideae) from Central and North America, Novon: A Journal for Botanical Nomenclature: Vol. 16, No. 3, pp. 413–420

External links
 WATTLE Acacias of Australia Lucid Web Player (multi-access key for identifying Australian Acacias)
List
Acacia
Acacia species